Kidnap is an action thriller Bengali film directed by Raja Chanda. The film produced by Nispal Singh under the banner of Surinder Films. Features Dev, Rukmini Maitra, Chandan Sen, Sahidur Rahman, Sriparna Roy, Prantik Banerjee, Buddhadeb Bhattacharya, and Ashim Roy Chowdhury in lead roles. This movie was released on 5 June 2019.

Cast 
 Dev as police officer Deep
 Rukmini Maitra as Meghna
 Chandan Sen as Tapas Bose
 Kamaleshwar Mukherjee as editor of "আজ কাল পরশু" 
 Kanchan Mullick as MLA Shanku Deb
 Buddhadeb Bhattacharya as CBI officer
 Sanjib Sarkar as Police Officer
 Shahidur Rahman as Bhaskar, the leader of women trafficking
 Sriparna Roy as Tapas' daughter, Trisha Bose
 Prantik Banerjee as Bhaskar's henchman
 Ashim Roy Chowdhury as Meghna's uncle.
 Rajat Malakar
 Soumyadeep Banerjee

Soundtrack

References

External links 
 

Bengali-language Indian films
2010s Bengali-language films
Indian films about revenge
Films about child trafficking in India
Films directed by Raja Chanda
2019 action thriller films
Indian action thriller films
Films scored by Jeet Ganguly